The 2005 World Youth Championships in Athletics were held in Marrakesh, Morocco on July 13–July 17. The host stadium was Stade Sidi Youssef Ben Ali.

The boy's 400 metres hurdles event was initially won by Sudan's Abdulagadir Idriss in a time of 50.78 seconds, but this was later annulled due to Idriss failing a doping control.

Results

Boys

Abdulagadir Idriss (Sudan) won the 400 metres hurdles final, but was later disqualified for doping.

Girls

Medal table

See also
2005 in athletics (track and field)

References
Official site (archived)

2005
World Youth Championships
Athletics
21st century in Marrakesh
Sports competitions in Marrakesh
International athletics competitions hosted by Morocco
2005 in youth sport